The Aftermath is the second album by Dystopia. It was originally released in 1999 as a four-track LP on Life Is Abuse Records, and as a 13-track CD featuring additional songs from their splits with Skaven and Suffering Luna, the Backstabber EP, and one unreleased cover, on Life Is Abuse Records, Misanthropic Records and Crawlspace Records. The final song, "Cosmetic Plague", begins near the end of track 12, and is a Rudimentary Peni cover. The LP version contains tracks 1–4 on side A and has an etching on side B.

Track listing 
"Population Birth Control" – 5:48
"Father's Gun" – 2:26
"Self Defeating Prophecy" – 5:20
"Sleep" – 6:05
"Socialized Death Sentence" – 3:09
"Backstabber" – 2:12
"They Live" – 2:39
"Anger Brought by Disease" – 2:50
"Jarhead Fertilizer" – 3:44
"Taste Your Own Medicine" – 1:50
"Instrumental" – 3:12
"Diary of a Battered Child" – 30:37

Notes
Tracks 1–4 originally appeared on the vinyl version of The Aftermath.
Tracks 5–7 originally appeared on the Backstabber EP.
Tracks 8–11 originally appeared on the split with Skaven.
Track 12 originally appeared on the split with Suffering Luna.
Track 13 was a ghost track.

Personnel
Todd Kiessling - bass
Dino Sommese - vocals, drums
Matt Parrilo - guitar, vocals, typography, artwork
Steve McCurry – album cover

References

1999 albums
Dystopia (band) albums